Western Saharan cuisine comprises the cuisine of Western Sahara, a disputed territory in the Maghreb region of North Africa, bordered by Morocco to the north, Algeria to the extreme northeast, Mauritania to the east and south, and the Atlantic Ocean to the west. The Western Saharan cuisine has several influences, as the population of that area (Sahrawi), in their most part are of Arabic and Berber origin. The Saharawi cuisine is also influenced by Spanish cuisine owing to Spanish colonisation.

Food is primarily imported into Western Sahara, as minimal rainfall in the territory inhibits agricultural production. Indigenous sources of food include those derived from fishing and nomadic pastoralism. The labor and business in these indigenous provisions of foods are also a primary contributor of income for the territory's population, and are among the primary contributors to the economy of Western Sahara.

A major staple food is the couscous that often accompanies one way or another all the food dishes. The influences of southern cuisine makes peanuts an accompaniment of some dishes.

For meat, the Sahrawis favour camel and goat; pork is not eaten, since it is not halal; lamb is also prominent. Some tribes are famous for growing wheat, barley and cereals in general.

Some fruits and vegetables are grown in oases that are scattered within the territory.

Common foods and dishes
Being almost entirely nomadic, Saharan tribes based their diet on meat, milk and dairy derivatives. Coastal tribes added fish dishes and rice.

 Couscous, meal paste, with meat and vegetables
 Tajín, camel meat, made solely from dromedaries
 Goat meat
 Meifrisa, a traditional dish of the region, is a stew prepared with rabbit, lamb or camel meat, onion, and garlic, served atop unleavened bread cooked in the sand.
 Ezzmit, cereals.
 El aych, cereals with milk.
 Arroz con pescado
 Various types of roasts.

Beverages

 Tea is more than just a drink for the Saharawi people. It is a way to meet with friends and family to share moments of conversation and friendship. It usually follows a ritual, in which are taken three vessels. In this regard, there is a popular comment: "The first glass of tea is bitter like life, the second cup sweet like love and the third soft as death."

 Camel milk, milked solely from dromedaries
 Goat milk

See also
 Moroccan cuisine

References

 Food Culture in Sub-Saharan Africa - Fran Osseo-Asare
 The Recipes of Africa – Dyfed Lloyd Evans

Further reading

External links
 "Places to eat in Western Sahara". Virtual Tourist.

North African cuisine
Maghrebi cuisine
Sahrawi culture
Arab cuisine